A cruise is any travel on a cruise ship.

Cruise or Cruises may also refer to:

Tourism
 Booze cruise
 Music cruise
 River cruise

Aeronautics and aircraft
 Cruise (aeronautics), a distinct stage of an aircraft's flight
 Aviasouz Cruise, a Russian ultralight trike design

Automotive
 Cruise (automotive), a gathering of modified cars
Cruise (autonomous vehicle), now GM Cruise LLC, a subsidiary of General Motors developing autonomous cars
Cruise control

Fashion
 Cruise collection, an inter-season line of clothing

Films
 The Cruise (1970 film), the English title of the Polish film Rejs
 The Cruise (1998 film), an American documentary
 Cruise (film), a 2018 romantic comedy film

Geography
 Cruise, Kentucky, a community in the United States
 Cruises Creek, a stream in Kentucky

Music
 Cruise (band), a rock band from the former Soviet Union
 Cruise (Akina Nakamori album), 1989
 Cruise (Whitehouse album), 2001
 "Cruise", a song by David Gilmour from About Face (1984)
 "Cruise" (song), a 2012 song by Florida Georgia Line

Radio and television
 Cruise 1323, a radio station in Adelaide, Australia
 The Cruise (1998 TV series), a 1998 British fly-on-the-wall documentary series set on the Galaxy cruise ship that aired on BBC One
 The Cruise (2016 TV series), a British reality television series set on the Regal Princess cruise ship that has aired on ITV since 2016
 "The Cruise" (Brooklyn Nine-Nine), a television episode

Other uses
 Cruise (name), a surname of English origin (includes a list of people named Cruise)
 Cruise missile

See also
 Cruiser (disambiguation)
 Cruising (disambiguation)
 Cruse (disambiguation)
 Cruz (disambiguation)
 Cruze (disambiguation)
 Cruzer
 Kruse (disambiguation)
 The Love Boat